Emory Isaac Cohen (born March 13, 1990) is an American actor. He made his feature film debut in Afterschool (2008). He is best known for his roles as AJ Cross in Derek Cianfrance's film The Place Beyond the Pines (2012), Tony Fiorello in John Crowley's film Brooklyn (2015), and Homer in the Netflix series The OA (2016).

Early life
Cohen was born in Manhattan, New York, New York, the only child of Donna (née Ackerman), a director of a preschool, and Noel Cohen, a music teacher. He is Jewish, and is a fourth generation New Yorker whose ancestors emigrated from Russia. Cohen made his stage debut as Mr. Peachum in a school production of The Threepenny Opera at the Robert F. Wagner Jr. Scondary School for Arts and Technology, under the direction of Alma Whitney and Oskar Sarasky. 

He graduated from Elisabeth Irwin High School in 2008 and received a full scholarship to study acting at the University of the Arts in Philadelphia, Pennsylvania. He trained at UArts for two years before dropping out to study acting in New York.

Career
Cohen made his feature film debut in Afterschool in 2008, opposite Ezra Miller. The film premiered at the 2008 Cannes Film Festival and received positive reviews from critics. His next role was in the 2010 drama film The Hungry Ghosts. In 2012, he co-starred in Derek Cianfrance's crime drama film The Place Beyond the Pines opposite Bradley Cooper and Dane DeHaan. The film received generally positive reviews and was a box office success.

He had a recurring role during the first season of Smash, playing Leo, the son of Debra Messing's character, and starred as Wendell Pierce's lover in the independent film Four.

In 2014, he appeared in the drama The Gambler playing a tennis player and in the independent film Beneath the Harvest Sky. In 2015, he portrayed Tony, the love interest of Eilis, played by Saoirse Ronan, in Brooklyn. Rex Reed praised his "wonderful, warm and deeply touching performance". In Variety, Kristopher Tapley wrote that Brooklyn offered "another reminder that Emory Cohen is one of the most exciting actors of his generation."

Cohen had a leading role in the 2015 independent film Stealing Cars, opposite Felicity Huffman and William H. Macy. He received positive reviews for his role as Billy Wyatt. In 2016, he starred in the Netflix series The OA.

Filmography

Film

Television

Awards and nominations

References

External links

1990 births
Living people
21st-century American male actors
American male film actors
American male stage actors
American male television actors
Jewish American male actors
American people of Russian-Jewish descent
People from Manhattan
Male actors from New York City
University of the Arts (Philadelphia) alumni
Little Red School House alumni
21st-century American Jews